Bulletist or bulletism is an artistic process that involves shooting ink at a blank piece of paper  The result is a type of ink blot. The artist can then develop images based on what is seen. Salvador Dalí named this technique. Leonardo da Vinci, suggested that "just as one can hear any desired syllable in the sound of a bell, so one can see any desired figure in the shape formed by throwing a sponge with ink against the wall."

See also
Surrealist techniques

References

Surrealist techniques
Salvador Dalí